Aphytoceros subflavalis is a moth in the family Crambidae. It was described by Charles Swinhoe in 1917. It is found on New Guinea.

The wings are uniform pale yellow with pale chocolate-brown markings.

References

Moths described in 1917
Spilomelinae
Moths of New Guinea